Wunna Maung Lwin (born 30 May 1952,) is a Burmese politician and a member of State Administration Council. He was a Minister of Foreign Affairs under Commander-in-Chief of Defence Services Min Aung Hlaing after the 2021 Myanmar coup d'état. He previously served as the Minister of Foreign Affairs from March 2011 to March 2016. He is a retired colonel in the Myanmar Army.

Early life and education
Wunna Maung Lwin was born in Thaton, Mon State on 30 May 1954. He graduated from the 16th intake of the Defence Services Academy in 1971.

Career 
He joined the Myanmar Diplomatic service in 2000, after a long career in the Myanmar Armed Forces from 1971 to 1998. Before he holds the current position, he served as Director-General of the Ministry of Border Affairs (Myanmar) from July 1998 to September 2000, Myanmar Ambassador to Israel from 2000 to 2001, France from 2001 to 2004, Belgium and EU from 2004 to 2007 and Permanent Representative to the United Nations in Geneva, Switzerland from 2007 to 2011.

Foreign Minister 
He served as the 19th Foreign Minister of Myanmar from 2011 to 2016. Thein Sein appointed him in his cabinet. Later he became the CEC member of USDP. In the 2020 general election, he lost to his opponent from NLD, Kyaw Htwe.

But after 2021 coup, Min Aung Hlaing appointed him as Foreign Minister. On 24 February, Wunna Maung Lwin met with Thailand Foreign Minister, Don Pramudwinai and Indonesia Foreign Minister, Retno Marsudi in Thailand. He also met with Thailand Prime Minister, Prayut Chan-o-cha. This was the first foreign trip of the military cabinet member.

Personal life 
Wunna Maung Lwin is married to Lin Lin Tin, the youngest daughter of Thakhin Ba Tin, a member of the Dobama Asiayone and a cousin of Kyu Kyu Hla. He has three children, Tin Thitsa Lwin, Lin Marlar Lwin, and Lin Min Maung Lwin.

References

|-

Living people
Government ministers of Myanmar
Defence Services Academy alumni
1952 births
People from Mon State
Foreign ministers of Myanmar
Ambassadors of Myanmar to Israel
Ambassadors of Myanmar to France
Ambassadors of Myanmar to Belgium
Permanent Representatives of Myanmar to the United Nations
Members of the State Administration Council